WVAI-LP is an urban contemporary formatted broadcast radio station licensed to Charlottesville, Virginia, serving Charlottesville and Albemarle County in Virginia.  WVAI-LP is owned and operated by Air Mix Virginia.

References

External links
 101 Jamz Online
 

2015 establishments in Virginia
Urban contemporary radio stations in the United States
Radio stations established in 2015
VAI-LP
VAI-LP
Mass media in Charlottesville, Virginia